Ludwik Szabakiewicz (24 June 1902 – 31 July 1944) was a Polish footballer. He played in two matches for the Poland national football team from 1925 to 1928.

References

External links
 

1902 births
1944 deaths
Polish footballers
Poland international footballers
Place of birth missing
Association footballers not categorized by position